The Albert Market, formerly known officially as Royal Albert Market, is a street market in Banjul, The Gambia. Located on Liberation Avenue, the market was built in the mid-nineteenth century. It is named after Albert, Prince Consort, husband of Queen Victoria of the United Kingdom of Great Britain and Ireland, who controlled the Gambia during colonial times.

Gallery

References

Retail markets in the Gambia
Buildings and structures in Banjul